Fred or Frederick Betts may refer to:

 Frederick Cronyn Betts (1896–1938), Canadian politician and solicitor
 Frederick E. Betts (1870–1942), Canadian ice hockey administrator and businessman
 Frederick Nicholson Betts (1906–1973), British Indian Army officer and ornithologist